The 1974 Invercargill mayoral election was part of the New Zealand local elections held that same year. The polling was conducted using the standard first-past-the-post electoral method. After just barely failing to rejoin the council at the 1971 election, former councillor C. V. Barham once again contested the mayoralty. Incumbent mayor F. Russell Miller easily defeated him, albeit with a reduced majority.

Results
The following table gives the election results:

References

1974 elections in New Zealand
Mayoral elections in Invercargill
October 1974 events in New Zealand